Baron Bloomfield, of Oakhampton and Redwood in the County of Tipperary, was a title in the Peerage of Ireland. It was created in 1825 for Lieutenant-General Sir Benjamin Bloomfield, an Irish-born British soldier, diplomat, politician and court official. In 1871 his son, the second Baron, was created Baron Bloomfield, of Ciamhaltha in the County of Tipperary, in the Peerage of the United Kingdom, on his retirement as British Ambassador to Austria. However, both titles became extinct upon the latter's death in 1879.

Barons Bloomfield (1825)
Benjamin Bloomfield, 1st Baron Bloomfield (1762–1846)
John Arthur Douglas Bloomfield, 2nd Baron Bloomfield (1802–1879)

Arms

References

Noble titles created in 1825
Noble titles created for UK MPs
Extinct baronies in the Peerage of Ireland
Noble titles created in 1871
Extinct baronies in the Peerage of the United Kingdom